On 1 November 1944, a United States Army Air Forces (USAAF) F-13 Superfortress conducted the first flight by an Allied aircraft over the Tokyo region of Japan since the Doolittle Raid in April 1942. This photo reconnaissance sortie returned with 7000 photographs which helped with planning air raids on Japan during the last months of World War II. Attempts by Japanese air units and anti-aircraft gun batteries to shoot down the F-13 failed, as the available fighter aircraft and guns could not reach the high altitude at which it operated.

Background

In late 1944 the United States Twentieth Air Force's XXI Bomber Command prepared to conduct strategic bombing raids on the Japanese home islands from bases in the Mariana Islands. These attacks were to replace the largely unsuccessful Operation Matterhorn raids which had been conducted by XX Bomber Command aircraft based in India and staging through bases in China since June 1944. While XX Bomber Command conducted photo reconnaissance sorties over Japan as part of this effort, the aircraft flying from China lacked the range to reach Japan's main industrial centers. Without photographic intelligence XXI Bomber Command was unable to develop detailed plans for raids against its intended targets.

On 10 October 1944 the Committee of Operations Analysts, which provided advice to USAAF commanders on suitable strategic bombardment targets, recommended that photo reconnaissance flights be conducted over Japan's main industrial areas as soon as possible to provide intelligence which could be used to direct raids from the Mariana Islands. These operations were to be conducted by the 3d Photographic Reconnaissance Squadron (3d PRS), which was the only photo reconnaissance unit in the XXI Bomber Command.

The 3d PRS had been formed on 10 June 1941. After conducting flights over the Americas, it was deployed to the China-Burma-India Theater. The unit flew mapping missions over the region from 10 December 1943 until it was disbanded and re-formed in the United States during April 1944 to be equipped with the new F-13 photo reconnaissance variant of the Boeing B-29 Superfortress heavy bomber. Due to delays to the development of the F-13, the 3d PRS was unable to commence training on the type until 24 August, and began to receive its first operational F-13s on 4 October. 3d PRS F-13s began to depart for Saipan in the Mariana Islands on 19 October, where they would be supported by the unit's ground echelon which had arrived on 18 September.

Photo reconnaissance sortie
The first two 3d PRS F-13s arrived at Saipan on 30 October after a 33-hour flight from Mather Field in California via Oahu and Kwajalein. While the commander of the XXI Bomber Command, Brigadier General Haywood S. Hansell, encouraged the exhausted airmen to rest, they insisted on conducting a flight over Japan as soon as possible.

At 5.55 am on 1 November an F-13 whose crew was led by Captain Ralph D. Steakley took off from Saipan bound for Japan. Weather conditions over Tokyo were perfect for photo reconnaissance, with the skies free of clouds. Overall, the American airmen took 7,000 photos during the mission. While most of the photos of Tokyo were of industrial areas, the aircraft also photographed the densely populated urban areas of the city which were firebombed later in the war. The jet stream over this region was not known to the USAAF at the time, and greatly complicated XXI Bomber Command's later air raids.

The Imperial Japanese Army Air Service's 47th Sentai provided fighter cover for Tokyo on 1 November. The unit's Nakajima Ki-44 fighters began to take off from Narimasu airfield to intercept the F-13 at 1 pm. Two formations of fighters fired machine guns at the F-13, but did not hit it. Several batteries of Japanese anti-aircraft guns also unsuccessfully fired on the American aircraft. The F-13 was the first American aircraft to fly over Tokyo since the Doolittle Raid in April 1942, and was seen by many Japanese civilians. Its presence over the city and the failure of the military to shoot it down increased the concerns many had over the course of the war.

Aftermath

The F-13 returned to Saipan after a 14-hour flight. By the next day the crew had named the aircraft "Tokyo Rose" in reference to the propaganda broadcaster. Steakley received the Distinguished Flying Cross for the flight, and the other members of the crew were also later decorated. It took weeks to process all of the photographs and months to fully analyse them.

The photographs taken during the sortie were an important source of intelligence for the Twentieth Air Force and other American units, especially as 1 November proved to be the only day of the air campaign against Japan in which weather conditions over the home islands were entirely clear of cloud. Hansell later said the sortie had been probably the greatest single contribution to the air war with Japan. 

The 3d PRS flew 16 more sorties over Japan before XXI Bomber Command's first raid against Tokyo on 24 November, but several of these missions were frustrated by bad weather. One F-13 was lost during a mission to Nagoya on 21 November, but the squadron had nine aircraft at Saipan by the end of the month. The 3d PRS continued to fly reconnaissance sorties over Japan until the end of the war.

References

Footnotes

Citations

Works cited

 
 
 
 

 
 
 
 
 

World War II strategic bombing of Japan
World War II aerial operations and battles of the Pacific theatre
1944 in Japan
November 1944 events
History of Tokyo